Nicki Bluhm (born September 22, 1979) is a singer-songwriter from Lafayette, California who formed The Gramblers in 2008. Since leaving the band she has released one studio album To Rise You Gotta Fall. Her other solo albums Toby's Song, Driftwood came before the Gramblers.

Career
Bluhm is from Lafayette, California  and since 2008 has released several albums including two with The Gramblers. They recorded David Bowie's song, Pressure,  for the "Best Moment" segment of the Espys awards in 2012  and their YouTube video of the Hall & Oates song "I Can't Go For That (No Can Do)" has been viewed more than a million times. In recent years, Bluhm has focused on a solo career but had stated that she is not "closing any doors" with the Gramblers.

Discography

In the studio

Solo albums
 Toby's Song (Little Knickers, 2008)
 Driftwood (Little Knickers, 2011, re-released 2012 on Little Sur Records, 2012)
 To Rise You Gotta Fall (Compass Records, 2018)
 To Rise You Gotta Fall Side b/w Right Down The Line (single) (Need To Know, 2019)

With her husband, Tim
 Duets (Little Sur Records, 2011)

With The Gramblers
 Nicki Bluhm and The Gramblers (Little Sur Records, 2013)
 Love Wild Lost (Little Sur Records, 2015)

Live recordings

With Brokedown in Bakersfield
 Brokedown in Bakersfield (Little Sur, 2014)

References

External links
Official website

American women country singers
American country singer-songwriters
1979 births
Living people
21st-century American women singers
Musicians from San Francisco
People from Lafayette, California
Singer-songwriters from California